Irakli Abashidze (10 September 1909 – 14 January 1992) was a Georgian poet, literary scholar and politician.

Abashidze was born in Khoni, Kutais Governorate, Russian Empire. He graduated from Tbilisi State University in 1931 and attended the 1st Congress of the Union of Soviet Writers in 1934, when socialist realism was laid down as the cultural orthodoxy. From 1953 to 1967, he chaired the Union of Georgian Writers.

In 1970, he also became a vice-president of the Georgian Academy of Sciences. In 1960 he organized an expedition to the Georgian-built Monastery of the Cross at Jerusalem where his team rediscovered a fresco of Shota Rustaveli, a medieval Georgian poet. He chaired the special academic commission for the Rustaveli studies since 1963 and became the founder and an editor-in-chief of The Georgian Soviet Encyclopedia in 1967.

His poems are viewed as classical works of Georgian literature. His poetry was mostly patriotic based on Georgian cultural and religious values, but normally loyal to Soviet ideology. He welcomed Mikhail Gorbachev’s perestroika and supported the Soviet-era dissident Zviad Gamsakhurdia when he came to power and led Georgia to the declaration of independence in 1991. Abashidze died in Tbilisi in 1992 and was afforded a state funeral. He was 82.

References 

Mikaberidze, Alexander (ed., 2007), Abashidze, Irakli. Dictionary of Georgian National Biography. Accessed on September 5, 2007.

1909 births
1992 deaths
20th-century male writers
20th-century poets from Georgia (country)
People from Khoni
People from Kutais Governorate
Male poets from Georgia (country)
Communist Party of Georgia (Soviet Union) politicians
Members of the Georgian National Academy of Sciences
Heroes of Socialist Labour
Recipients of the Order of Friendship of Peoples
Recipients of the Order of Lenin
Recipients of the Order of the Red Banner of Labour
Rustaveli Prize winners
Burials at Didube Pantheon
Soviet poets